Dongshan Township is a rural township in the central part of Yilan County, Taiwan.

Geography

 Area: 79.86 km2
 Population: 52,894 people (February 2023)

Administrative divisions
Zhenzhu, Bucheng, Sanji, Daxing, Tungcheng, Xianghe, Nanxing, Anping, Dongshan, Taihe, Babao, Wanshan, Zhongshan, Shunan, Yongmei, Wuyuan, Qunying, Qinggou, Lupu, Dean, Guangxing, Guangan, Kelin and Dajin Village.

Economy
The main industry in Dongshan Township are agriculture and tourism. In agriculture, tea and pomelo are the specialties for this township. While the tourism industry creates more business in leisure, food and beverages and farm tourism.

Tourist attractions
 Meihua Lake
 Shangri-La Leisure Farm

Transportation

The township is accessible by the Dongshan Station of the Taiwan Railway Administration.

Notable natives

 Lee Chin-lung, Minister of Council of Agriculture (2002–2006)
 Liao Feng-teh, politician
 Yu Shyi-kun, Premier of the Republic of China (2002–2005)

References

External links

  

Townships in Yilan County, Taiwan